Luke John Herrmann (born Lutz Johann Wolfgang Maximilian Hermann; 9 March 1932 – 9 September 2016) was a British art historian who was an expert on the art of J.M.W. Turner.

Early life
Herrmann was born on 9 March 1932 in Berlin into a German Jewish family. He was educated in England at Westminster School and at the University of Oxford.

Career
Herrmann worked at the Illustrated London News where he got to know the editor Bruce Ingram who was a prominent art collector and under whose guidance he began to collect English watercolour paintings in the 1950s. After Ingram's death in 1963, Herrmann inherited over 30 pictures from him which he donated to a selection of British art galleries in 2002. He later worked at the Ashmolean Museum.

Personal life
In 1965, Herrmann married Georgina ( Thompson); she would go on to become a notable archaeologist of Western Asia. Together they had two sons.

Herrmann died on 9 September 2016.

Selected publications
Ruskin and Turner: A study of Ruskin as a collector of Turner, based on his gifts to the University of Oxford; incorporating a catalogue raisonné of the Turner drawings in the Ashmolean Museum. F.A. Praeger, New York, 1969.
British landscape painting of the eighteenth century. Faber & Faber, London, 1973. 
Turner: Paintings, watercolours, prints, and drawings. Phaidon Press, London, 1975. 
Paul and Thomas Sandby. B.T. Batsford in association with the Victoria & Albert Museum, London, 1986. 
Turner prints: The engraved work of J.M.W. Turner. Phaidon Press, 1994. 
Nineteenth century British painting. Giles de la Mare, London, 2000. 
J.M.W. Turner. Oxford University Press, Oxford, 2007. (Very Interesting People series)

References 

1932 births
2016 deaths
British art historians
J. M. W. Turner
Academics of the University of Leicester
People associated with the Ashmolean Museum
Jewish emigrants from Nazi Germany to the United Kingdom
People educated at Westminster School, London
Alumni of the University of Oxford